Clet is a surname. Notable people with the surname include:

Antoine Clet (1705–1785), French printer, publisher, and writer
Francis Regis Clet (1748–1820), martyr saint of China

See also
Saint-Clet (disambiguation)